HEPACAM family member 2 is a protein that in humans is encoded by the HEPACAM2 gene.

Function

This gene encodes a protein related to the immunoglobulin superfamily that plays a role in mitosis. Knockdown of this gene results in prometaphase arrest, abnormal nuclear morphology, and apoptosis. 

Poly (ADP-ribosylation) of the encoded protein promotes its translocation to centrosomes, which may stimulate centrosome maturation. A chromosomal deletion including this gene may be associated with myeloid leukemia and myelodysplastic syndrome in human patients.

References

Further reading